GEPA can mean:
 Grade Eight Proficiency Assessment - New Jersey student assessment
 Gepa The Fair Trade Company - Europe's largest alternative trading organization
 Guam Environmental Protection Agency